The discography of Dave Swarbrick, an English folk musician and singer-songwriter, consists of 11 solo studio albums, and many other albums with other bands and musicians, most notably with British folk rock band Fairport Convention, with whom he was a leading member and violinist for over fifteen years. He also appears as a guest musician on the albums of a large number of other artists.

Solo albums
 Swarbrick (Transatlantic, 1976)
 Swarbrick 2 (Transatlantic, 1977)
 Lift The Lid and Listen (Sonet, 1978)
 The Ceilidh Album (Sonet, 1978)
 Smiddyburn (Logo, 1981)
 Flittin''' (Spindrift, 1983)
 When the Battle is Over [compilation from: Swarbrick (1976); Swarbrick 2 (1977); Smiddyburn (1981)] (Conifer, 1986)
 Live at Jackson's Lane (Musikfolk, 1996)
 English Fiddler: Swarbrick plays Swarbrick (Naxos World, 2003)
 It Suits Me Well: The Transatlantic Anthology (Castle, 2004)
  Raison d'être (Shirty, 2010)

With Fairport ConventionUnhalfbricking (Island, 1969, not a full-fledged member but played on four of the eight tracks)Liege & Lief (Island, 1969)Full House (Island, 1970)Angel Delight (Island, 1971)"Babbacombe" Lee (Island, 1971)Rosie (Island, 1973)Nine (A&M, 1973)Rising for the Moon (Island, 1975)Gottle O'Geer (Island, 1976, credited to "Fairport featuring Dave Swarbrick" in the US, to "Fairport" in the UK)The Bonny Bunch of Roses (Vertigo, 1977)Tipplers Tales (Vertigo, 1978)

With the Ian Campbell Folk Group
 Ceilidh at the Crown (EP) (Topic, 1962)
 Songs of Protest (EP) (Topic, 1962)
 "The Sun Is Burning" / "The Crow and the Cradle" (single) (Topic, 1963)
 This Is The Ian Campbell Folk Group (Transatlantic, 1963)
 Across the Hills (Transatlantic, 1964)
 The Ian Campbell Folk Group (EP) (Decca, 1964)
 Presenting the Ian Campbell Folk Group (Contour, 1964, same track list as This Is The Ian Campbell Folk Group)
 Coaldust Ballads (Transatlantic, 1965)
 A Sample of The Ian Campbell Folk Group (EP)  (Transatlantic, 1966)
 Contemporary Campbells (Transatlantic, 1966)
 Four Highland Songs (EP) (Transatlantic, 1966)
 This Is The Ian Campbell Folk Group / Across the Hills (Castle Music, 1996)
 Contemporary Campbells / New Impressions (Castle Music, 1997)
 The Times They Are A-Changin (Castle Music, 2005)

On Ewan MacColl, A. L. Lloyd and Peggy Seeger albums
 Whaler Out of New Bedford (Folkways, 1962)
 The Big Hewer (The Radio Ballads Vol 4) (Argo, 1967)
 The Fight Game (The Radio Ballads Vol 7) (Argo, 1967)
 The Travelling People (The Radio Ballads Vol 8) (Argo, 1968)

On Ewan MacColl and A. L. Lloyd albums
 A Sailor's Garland (Prestige, 1962)

With various artists
 Edinburgh Folk Festival Vol. 1 (Decca, 1963)
 Edinburgh Folk Festival Vol. 2 (Decca, 1964)
 Farewell Nancy: Sea Songs and Shanties (Topic, 1964)
 The Bird in the Bush: Traditional Erotic Songs (Topic, 1966)
 The Best of British Folk Music (Transatlantic, 1966)
 Nice Enough to Eat (Island, 1969)
 El Pea (Island, 1971)
 Clogs (Peg Records, 1972)
 Club Folk Volume 1 (Peg Records, 1972)
 Club Folk Volume 2 (Peg Records, 1972)
 Rave On (B&C/Mooncrest, 1974)
 The Camera and the Song (Super Beeb, 1975)
 The Electric Muse (Island/Transatlantic, 1975)
 Rosin the Bow: An Introduction to the World of Fiddle Music (Transatlantic, 1977)
 The Best of Irish Folk (1978)
 Transatlantic – The Vintage Years (Transatlantic, 1978)
 40 Folk Favourites (Pickwick, 1979)
 Chants de Marins IV: Ballades, Complaintes et Shanties des Matelots Anglais (Le Chasse-Marée, 1984)
 Flash Company – A Celebration of the First 10 Years of Fellside Recordings (Fellside, 1986)
 Island Life: 25 Years of Island Record (Island, 1988)
 Blow the Man Down: A Collection of Sea Songs and Shanties (Topic, 1993).
 Club Sandwich (cassette) (Musikfolk, 1993)
 Tanz- & Folkfest Rudolstadt 1992 (HeiDeck, 1993)
 The World Is a Wonderful Place (Hokey Pokey, 1993)
 Undefeated (cassette) (Fuse, 1993)
 Folk Routes (Island, 1994)
 Troubadours of British Folk, Vol. 1: Unearthing the Tradition, (Rhino, 1995)
 Troubadours of British Folk, Vol. 2: Folk into Rock (Rhino, 1995)
 Various Artists, The Bird in the Bush: Traditional Songs of Love and Lust (Topic, 1996)
 Georgia on Our Mind (Deep Sea, 1997)
 New Electric Muse II (Castle Music, 1997)
 Bold Sportsmen All (Topic, 1998)
 The Rough Guide to English Roots Music (World Music Network, 1998)
 Various Artists, English Originals (Topic, 1999)
 The Fiddle Collection Volume One (Hands On Music, 1999)
 The Folk Collection (Topic, 1999)
 Heart of England: In Aid of Teenage Cancer Trust (Teenage Cancer Trust, 2001)
 Flash Company – A Celebration of 25 Years of Fellside Recordings (Fellside, 2001)
 Raise Your Banners: Festival of Political Song (Raise Your Banners Festival, 2001)
 The Acoustic Folk Box (Topic, 2002)
 Red Roots (Red Planet, 2002)
 Heart of England 2: In Aid of Teenage Cancer Trust (Teenage Cancer Trust, 2002)
 Strangely Strange But Oddly Normal: An Island Anthology 1967–1972 (Universal/Island, 2005)
 Anthems in Eden: An Anthology of British & Irish Folk 1955–1978 (Castle, 2006)
 The Fairport Companion: Loose Chippings from the Fairport Family Tree (Castle Music, 2006)
 Garden of Delight (Discothèque, 2006)
 Scarborough Fair (Castle Music, 2006)
 Various Artists, White Bicycles: Making Music in the 1960s (Fledg'ling, 2006)
 Folk Awards 2007 (Proper Folk, 2006)

On Martin Carthy albums
 Martin Carthy (Fontana, 1965)
 Martin Carthy, This is ... Martin Carthy: The Bonny Black Hare and Other Songs (Philips, 1971)
 Martin Carthy, The Carthy Chronicles (Free Reed, 2001)

With Martin Carthy
 Second Album (Fontana, 1966)
 Byker Hill (Fontana, 1967)
 No Songs (EP) (Fontana, 1967)
 But Two Came By (Fontana, 1968)
 Prince Heathen (Fontana, 1969)
 Selections (Pegasus, 1971)
 Life And Limb (Special Delivery, 1990)
 Skin And Bone (Special Delivery, 1992)
 Both Ears and the Tail: Live at the Folkus Folk Club, Nottingham, 1966 (Atrax, 2000)
 Straws In The Wind (Topic, 2006)

On Julie Felix albums
 Changes (Fontana, 1966)

On A. L. Lloyd albums
 First Person (Topic, 1966)
 Leviathan! Ballads and Songs of the Whaling Trade (Topic, 1967)
 The Great Australian Legend: A Panorama of Bush Balladry and Song (Topic, 1971)
 Classic A. L. Lloyd (Fellside, 1994)
 A.L. Lloyd, The Old Bush Songs (Larrikin, 1994)

With Martin Carthy and Diz DisleyRags, Reels & Airs (Polydor, 1967)

On Nigel Denver albums
 Rebellion! (Decca, 1967)

On Vashti Bunyan albums
 Just Another Diamond Day (Philips, 1970)

On John Renbourn albums
 The Lady and the Unicorn (Transatlantic, 1970)

On Sandy Denny albums
 Sandy (Island, 1972)
 Who Knows Where the Time Goes? (Island, 1986)
 The Best of Sandy Denny (Island, 1987)
 No More Sad Refrains: The Anthology (Island, 2000)
 A Boxful of Treasures (Fledg'ling, 2004)
 The Notes and the Words: A Collection of Demos and Rarities (Island, 2012)
 Rendezvous (Island, 2012)

On Al Stewart albums
 Past, Present & Future (CBS, 1973)

On Brian Maxine albums
 Ribbon of Stainless Steel (Columbia, 1974)

On Lorna Campbell albums
 Adam's Rib (Transatlantic, 1976)

On Richard Thompson albums
 (guitar, vocal) (Island, 1976)
 Watching the Dark – The History of Richard Thompson (Hannibal, 1993)
 RT: The Life and Music of Richard Thompson (Free Reed, 2006)

On Peter Bellamy albums
 The Transports (Free Reed, 1977)
 Both Sides Then (Topic, 1979)

On Bat McGrath albums
 Whatever Happened to Jousting? (Manana, 1980)

With Simon Nicol
 Live at the White Bear (White Bear, 1981)
 In the Club (cassette)(1982)
 Close to the Wind (Woodworm, 1984)
 Close to the White Bear (Woodworm, 1998) [compilation from Live at the White Bear and Close to the Wind]
 Another Fine Mess: Live in New York '84 (Atrax, 2002)
 When We Were Very Young  (Talking Elephant, 2010)

With Whippersnapper
 Promises (WPS, 1985)
 Tsubo (WPS, 1987)
 These Foolish Strings (WPS, 1988)
 Fortune (WPS, 1989)

On Voice of the Beehive albums
 Let It Bee (London, 1988)

On Leon Rosselson albums
 Wo sind die Elefanten? (Fuse Records, 1992)

On The Band of Hope albums
 Rhythm & Reds (Musikfolk, 1994)

On Pete Hawkes albums
 Secrets, Vows & Lies (Select Records, 1996)
 Unspoken Riddles (Select Records, 1996)

With Alistair Hulett
 Saturday Johnny and Jimmy The Rat (Red Rattler, 1996)
 The Cold Grey Light of Dawn (Musikfolk, 1998)
 Red Clydeside (Red Rattler, 2002)

On Keith Hancock albums
 Born Blue (Nico's Records, 1997)
 The Keith Hancock Band Live (Epona Records, 2015)

Collaboration with Eureka!
 Jammin' with Gypsy (Word of Mouth, 1998)

Compilations including other artists
 Folk on 2: Dave Swarbrick's 50th Birthday Concert (Cooking Vinyl, 1996)
 Dave Pegg and Friends, Birthday Party (Woodworm, 1998)
 Swarb! Forty Five Years of Folk's Finest Fiddler: The Life and Music of Dave Swarbrick (compilation box set) (Free Reed, 2003)
 Dave Pegg: 60th Birthday Bash  (Matty Groves, 2007)

Collaboration with Dave Swarbrick and Fairport Convention
 SwarbAid (Woodworm Records, 1999)
 Scrum-Half Bricking - Fairport With Swarb at Derby (Front Row Records, 2003)

On Steve Ashley albums
 Stroll On – Revisited (Market Square, 1999)

On Roy Bailey albums
 Coda (Fuse, 2000)

On John Kirkpatrick albums
 Mazurka Berserker (Fledg'ling, 2001)

On Bert Jansch albums
 Edge of a Dream (Sanctuary, 2002)

With Swarb's LazarusLive and Kicking (Squiggle, 2006)

With The Jason Wilson BandThe Peacemaker's Chauffeur (Wheel, 2008)Lion Rampant (Wheel/Proper, 2014)

With The Geoff Everett BandThe Quick and the Dead (Not On Label, 2012)

With Red ShoesAll The Good Friends (Cedarwood Records, 2012)

With Said the MaidenA Curious Tale (Maiden Records, 2014)

With Duncan Wood and guestsSwarbtricks'' (Beechwood Records, 2013)

References

Discographies of British artists
Folk music discographies